Peter of Castile was the king of Castile from 1350 to 1369.

Peter of Castile may also refer to:
Peter of Castile, Lord of Ledesma
Peter of Castile, Lord of Cameros